Jonah Mathews (born February 10, 1998) is an American professional basketball player for ASVEL of the French LNB Pro A and the EuroLeague. He played college basketball for the USC Trojans.

High school career
Mathews attended Santa Monica High School. As a freshman, he was part of the team that won the Southern Section 1A championship. He helped Santa Monica win the Southern Section 1A title during his senior season, scoring 33 points in the championship game against Temecula Valley High School. Mathews averaged 24.1 points, 8.4 rebounds and 6.2 assists per game as a senior, earning 2016 CIF Southern Section Division 1A Player of the Year. A four-star prospect, he was ranked the No. 11 shooting guard and the No. 72 overall prospect in his high school class. In September 2015, Mathews committed to USC over Gonzaga and San Diego State, in part due to his relationship with Trojans assistant coach Jason Hart.

College career
As a freshman at USC, Mathews averaged 7.0 points and 1.8 rebounds per game. Mathews was slowed by a sprained ankle during his sophomore season and endured a shooting slump, which he reversed by changing his pair of shoes. On March 10, 2018, Mathews scored a career-high 27 points in a 74–54 win over Oregon in the semifinal of the Pac-12 tournament. He averaged 9.3 points and 2.6 rebounds per game as a sophomore. Mathews started every game as a junior, averaging 12.6 points and 2.9 rebounds per game. On March 7, 2020, Mathews hit the game-winning three-pointer with one second remaining and finished with 19 points in a 54–52 win against UCLA. As a senior, Mathews averaged 13.4 points and 2.5 rebounds per game. He was named to the Second Team All-Pac-12 as well as the conference Defensive Team. Mathews finished his college career as the school leader in made three-pointers (247) and his 1,390 points ranks 17th on USC's all-time scoring list.

Professional career
On September 4, 2020, Mathews signed his first professional contract with the Leicester Riders of the British Basketball League. However, he left the team on September 19, to prepare for the NBA draft. On December 22, 2020, Mathews signed with the Köping Stars of the Swedish Basketball League. He signed with the Saskatchewan Rattlers of the Canadian Elite Basketball League but did not join the team. On July 24, 2021, Mathews signed with Anwil Włocławek of the Polish Basketball League.

On July 1, 2022, he has signed with ASVEL of the French LNB Pro A.

Career statistics

College

|-
| style="text-align:left;"| 2016–17
| style="text-align:left;"| USC
| 35 || 3 || 20.4 || .372 || .331 || .692 || 1.8 || 1.1 || .9 || .1 || 7.0
|-
| style="text-align:left;"| 2017–18
| style="text-align:left;"| USC
| 34 || 23 || 27.1 || .458 || .423 || .600 || 2.6 || .9 || .6 || .1 || 9.3
|-
| style="text-align:left;"| 2018–19
| style="text-align:left;"| USC
| 33 || 33 || 33.2 || .431 || .392 || .705 || 2.9 || 2.2 || 1.2 || .3 || 12.6
|-
| style="text-align:left;"| 2019–20
| style="text-align:left;"| USC
| 31 || 28 || 32.1 || .391 || .381 || .740 || 2.5 || 1.9 || 1.4 || .2 || 13.4
|- class="sortbottom"
| style="text-align:center;" colspan="2"| Career
| 133 || 87 || 28.0 || .414 || .384 || .698 || 2.5 || 1.5 || 1.0 || .2 || 10.5

Personal life
Mathews is the younger brother of professional basketball player Jordan Mathews. His father, Phil Mathews, is the head coach of Riverside City College. Mathews is interested in becoming a broadcaster after his playing days, and he took a broadcast journalism class at USC.

References

External links
USC Trojans bio

1998 births
Living people
American men's basketball players
ASVEL Basket players
Basketball players from Santa Monica, California
KK Włocławek players
Shooting guards
USC Trojans men's basketball players